The Delhi–Gurgaon Expressway on NH-48 is a  six to eight lane expressway connecting the national capital, Delhi and the Millennium city of Gurgaon, Haryana in the National Capital Region of India. The expressway is a part of the Golden Quadrilateral project, which itself is a part of the National Highway Development Project. The ,  brownfield expressway was opened in phases with the final section opening on January 23, 2008. This expressway is the busiest inter-city route in India and handles more than 180,000 PCUs daily. It starts at Dhaula Kuan in Delhi and terminates on the outskirts of Gurgaon. Gurgaon City is located at both sides of this Expressway.

See also 
 Expressways in India
 Highways passing from Delhi
 List of highways in Haryana
 National highways of India
 National Highways Development Project

References

External links 

Delhi Gurgaon Expressway

Roads in Delhi
Transport in Gurgaon
Expressways in Haryana
Toll roads in India